The 2021 Major League Rugby season was the fourth season of Major League Rugby, the professional rugby union competition sanctioned by USA Rugby. The regular season began on March 20, 2021.

One team made their debut in 2021: the LA Giltinis. The season also marks the first team departure in the league's history, with the Colorado Raptors. MLR history was made when United States Rugby referee Kat Roche became the first woman in a lead officiating role in a match (Seattle Seawolves vs Houston SaberCats on July 15).

Teams and format

Trial laws

Several new rules were introduced for the 2021 season, some of which are not practiced in other rugby leagues:

 Kick Clock: Kickers will now have sixty seconds as opposed to ninety seconds for both conversions and penalties.
 Seven points will be automatically awarded for any try scored directly under the posts and kicking a conversion will no longer be necessary.
 Referees will work with stricter protocols that will limit the number of scrums to two per incident – the original plus one reset for a collapse, penalty, or freekick.
 The offside line will be the feed line/channel of the scrum to allow for unimpeded access to the ball at the back of the scrum for the attacking team.
 No longer will a red card mean a team plays a man down for the remainder of the match. Under the new law a red card would lead to a player being sent off and the team goes down to 14 players for 20 minutes. After 20 minutes, the player can be replaced with another player on the bench.

Regular season
The regular season consists of eighteen weeks, with each team playing 16 matches, beginning on March 20, 2021.

Standings

Matches

Updated to match(es) played on 17 July 2021 
Colors: Blue: home team win; Yellow: draw; Red: away team win.

Scheduled matches

Week 1 (March 20–21)

Week 2 (March 27–28)

Week 3 (April 3)

Week 4 (April 10–11)

Week 5 (April 17–18)

Week 6 (April 24–25)

Week 7 (May 1–2)

Week 8 (May 8–9)

Week 9 (May 15–16)

Week 10 (May 19–23)

Week 11 (May 29-30)

Week 12 (June 5-6)

Week 13 (June 12-13)

Week 14 (June 19-20)

Week 15 (June 26-27)

Week 16 (July 3-4)

Week 17 (July 10-11)

Week 18 (July 15-18)

Playoffs

Semifinals

Final

Player statistics

Top scorers
The top ten try and point scorers during the 2021 Major League Rugby season were:

Last updated: August 2, 2021

Sanctions

End of Season Awards

All-MLR Awards

All-MLR First Team
The top 30 players throughout the season were selected to make up the first and second All-MLR teams. The selections were voted on by a group made up of MLR media, referees, and stats specialists.

The 2021 All-MLR First XV Team is:

All-MLR Second Team
The All-MLR Second XV Team is:

Honorable Mention

For the first time in MLR history, an additional 15 players were also named "Honorable Mention" because of the 'surplus of excellent nominees'.

Notes

References

Major League Rugby seasons
Major League Rugby
Major League Rugby
Major League Rugby